Little Hare is a 1964 Soviet comedy film directed by Leonid Bykov.

Plot 
The film tells about an honest, shy and kind man who works as a make-up artist in the theater, who suddenly gets to know he has a month left to live. He decides to spend the last month of his life with dignity and like a good man. The hero starts doing things he was afraid to do his entire life: putting rude people back into their place, protecting people from injustice and self-righteous or abusive people, defending all he can with no second thoughts or regrets. He has no fear now, he is not afraid to be left alone or be laughed at. 
In the end, as it turns out, the deadly prognosis (which he actually came to know because he was eavesdropping), was about an actual hare (a play of words: His surname is Zaychik. Zaychik is also a word for "little hare", hence the name of movie). But by that time he has become a different man: decisive, courageous and knowing his worth.

Themes

Cast 
 Leonid Bykov as Lev  Zaychik
 Olga Krasina as Natasha
 Igor Gorbachyov as Shabashnikov
 Sergey Filippov as Theater Director
 Georgy Vitsin as Assistant Director
 Aleksei Smirnov as Sound Effects Man
 Igor Dmitriev as Count Nulin
 Lev Stepanov as Patronchikov  
 Glikeriya Bogdanova-Chesnokova as  Glikeriya Vasilievna

Music 
The song "Waves go out on the sand without a trace", performed by L. Bykov himself, was written by screenwriter Kim Ryzhov (lyrics) and composer Andrey Petrov. It was recorded by Leningrad Radio and Television Orchestra conducted by A. Vladimirtsov.

Release 
One of the leaders of the Soviet box office in 1965: 16th place among domestic films (23rd place in the general list) with 25.1 million viewers.

References

External links 
 

1964 films
1960s Russian-language films
Soviet romantic comedy films
1964 romantic comedy films
Lenfilm films